Programmed cell death protein 2 is a protein that in humans is encoded by the PDCD2 gene.

Function 

This gene encodes a nuclear protein expressed in a variety of tissues. The rat homolog, Rp8, is transiently expressed in immature thymocytes and is thought to be involved in programmed cell death. Expression of the human gene has been shown to be repressed by BCL6, a transcriptional repressor required for lymph node germinal center development, suggesting that BCL6 regulates apoptosis by its effects on PDCD2. This gene is closely linked on chromosome 6 to the gene for TBP, the TATA binding protein. Six transcripts encoding different proteins have been identified.

Interactions 

PDCD2 has been shown to interact with Host cell factor C1 and Parkin (ligase).

Model organisms 

Model organisms have been used in the study of PDCD2 function. A conditional knockout mouse line called Pdcd2tm1b(EUCOMM)Wtsi was generated at the Wellcome Trust Sanger Institute. Male and female animals underwent a standardized phenotypic screen to determine the effects of deletion. Additional screens performed:  - In-depth immunological phenotyping

References

Further reading